Pennsylvania's 10th congressional district is located in the south-central region of the state. It encompasses all of Dauphin County as well as parts of Cumberland County and York County. The district includes the cities of Harrisburg and York. Prior to 2019, the district was located in the northeastern part of the state. The Supreme Court of Pennsylvania redrew the district in 2018 after ruling the previous map unconstitutional due to gerrymandering. The court added State College to the old district's boundaries while removing some Democratic-leaning areas and redesignated it the twelfth district, and they reassigned the tenth district to an area around Harrisburg and York. The new tenth district is represented by Republican Scott Perry, who previously represented the old fourth district.

The district was one of the 12 original districts created prior to the 4th Congress. In 2006, when it was still located in northeastern Pennsylvania, the 10th district experienced one of the greatest party shifts among all House seats that switched party control: in 2004, Republican Don Sherwood won with an 86% margin of victory over his nearest opponent and two years later, Democrat Chris Carney unseated Sherwood by a 53%–47% margin. In 2008, Carney won reelection by 12 points but the district swung back in 2010, electing Republican Tom Marino. The district was mostly Republican in its political composition, an aspect of the district that was reflected especially well in presidential elections. In 2004, President George W. Bush won 60 percent of the vote in the district and in 2008, Senator John McCain beat Senator Barack Obama here by a margin of 54 percent to 45 percent. Nonetheless, Carney easily won reelection as a Democrat the same year McCain won the district. However, in the 2010 midterm elections, Marino unseated Carney by a 55%–45% margin. In 2016, local businessman and former mayor of Lewisburg, Mike Molesevich challenged Marino for the seat, but he fell to the Republican in November by more than two to one. In 2018, Marino won election to a redrawn 12th district; while he remained the congressman for the 10th district into January 2019, he moved within the new district's boundaries beforehand.

Demographics 
According to the APM Research Lab's Voter Profile Tools (featuring the U.S. Census Bureau's 2019 American Community Survey), the district contained about 559,000 potential voters (citizens, age 18+). Of these, 80% are White, 10% Black, and 6% Latino. Immigrants make up 5% of the district's potential voters. Median income among households (with one or more potential voter) in the district is about $67,300, while 9% of households live below the poverty line. As for the educational attainment of potential voters in the district, 9% of those 25 and older have not earned a high school diploma, while 30% hold a bachelor's or higher degree.

District boundaries 2003–2013 

The Pennsylvania 10th was the third-largest congressional district in the state. The district encompassed the following counties and areas:

 Bradford County
 Lackawanna County
 excluding Old Forge, Moosic, Scranton, and Dunmore but including Clarks Summit
 Luzerne County
 Back Mountain area, including Dallas, Shavertown, Trucksville, Kingston, Wyoming, and Swoyersville
 Lycoming County
 Sullivan/Columbia/Montour County boundaries west to the West Branch of the Susquehanna River (except Montoursville), north to Cogan House
 Montour County
 Northumberland County
 Pike County
 Snyder County
 Sullivan County
 Susquehanna County
 Tioga County
 Ward Township
 Union County
 Wayne County
 Wyoming County

District boundaries 2013–2019 

On June 8, 2012, The Pennsylvania Legislative Reapportionment Commission adopted a revised final redistricting plan.  On May 8, 2013, The state Supreme Court unanimously approved the Legislative Reapportionment Commission's 2012 Revised Final Plan.  The resulting district encompassed the following areas:
 Bradford County
 Juniata County
 Parts of Lackawanna County
 Including: Abington Township, Benton Township, Ransom, Newton, South Abington, Clarks Summit, Clarks Green, Glenburn, West Abington, Dalton, La Plume, North Abington, Scott, Greenfield, Fell, Vandling, Jefferson, Olyphant, Madison, Covington, Clifton, Moscow, Elmhurst, Roaring Brook, parts of Carbondale, and parts of Archbald.
 Lycoming County
 Mifflin County
 Parts of Monroe County
 Including: Barrett, East Stroudsburg, Jackson, Mount Pocono, Paradise, Pocono, Price, Stroudsburg, and parts of Stroud.
 Parts of Northumberland County
 Including: Delaware, East Chillisquaque, West Chillisquaque, Watsontown, Lewis, Turbotville, Turbot, Milton, Point, Northumberland
 Parts of Perry County
 Including: Toboyne, Jackson, Blain, Northeast Madison, Southwest Madison, Landisburg, Tyrone, Saville, Centre, New Bloomfield, Tuscarora, Juniata, Greenwood, Millerstown, Oliver, Newport, Miller, Howe, Liverpool Township, Liverpool, Buffalo, Watts, and New Buffalo.
 Pike County
 Snyder County
 Sullivan County
 Susquehanna County
 Majority of Tioga County
 With the exception of Clymer Township, Chatham Township, Gaines Township, and the majority of Shippen Township
 Union County
 Wayne County

2016 election

Primary
Rep. Tom Marino declared his intent to run for his 4th term and was uncontested in the Republican primary. Originally, no Democratic candidates filed to run for office, upon this revelation, Mike Molesevich, an environmental contractor and former Lewisburg mayor, announced he would seek a write-in campaign to get on the general election ballot.  Write-in candidates need over 1,000 votes in the primary election to appear on the ballot in the 2016 general election. Mike Molesevich succeeded in his effort, receiving 2425 votes, earning a spot on the general election ballot. Jerry Kairnes of Lycoming County announced that he would seek to be on the November ballot as an Independent, but dropped out after Molesevich earned a spot on the ballot

Recent elections

2006 election

2008 election

2010 election

2012 election

2014 election

2016 election

2018 election

2020 election

2022 election

List of members representing the district
District created in 1795.

1795–1813: One seat

1813–1823: Two seats

1823–present: One seat

Historical district boundaries

See also
List of United States congressional districts
Pennsylvania's congressional districts

References
 
 
 Congressional Biographical Directory of the United States 1774–present

Notes

External links
 Congressional redistricting in Pennsylvania

10
Government of Bradford County, Pennsylvania
Government of Lackawanna County, Pennsylvania
Government of Luzerne County, Pennsylvania
Government of Lycoming County, Pennsylvania
Government of Montour County, Pennsylvania
Government of Northumberland County, Pennsylvania
Government of Pike County, Pennsylvania
Government of Snyder County, Pennsylvania
Government of Sullivan County, Pennsylvania
Government of Susquehanna County, Pennsylvania
Government of Tioga County, Pennsylvania
Government of Union County, Pennsylvania
Government of Wayne County, Pennsylvania
Government of Wyoming County, Pennsylvania
Constituencies established in 1795
1795 establishments in Pennsylvania